Pseudopoecilia is a genus of small poeciliid fishes native to rivers, streams, springs, ponds and pools in the Chocó-Tumbes region in southwestern Colombia, western Ecuador and northwestern Peru.

Species
There are currently three recognized species in this genus:
 Pseudopoecilia austrocolumbiana Radda, 1987
 Pseudopoecilia festae (Boulenger, 1898)
 Pseudopoecilia fria (C. H. Eigenmann & Henn, 1914)

References

Poeciliidae
Fish of South America
Freshwater fish genera
Taxa named by Charles Tate Regan
Ray-finned fish genera